Michael Patrick Rucker (born April 27, 1994) is an American professional baseball pitcher for the Chicago Cubs of Major League Baseball (MLB). He made his MLB debut in 2021.

Amateur career
Rucker played high school baseball while attending Auburn Riverside High School in Auburn, Washington. In 2011, as a junior, he was 8–2 with a 1.51 earned run average (ERA). Undrafted out of high school in the 2012 Major League Baseball draft, Rucker enrolled at Gonzaga University to play college baseball for the Bulldogs. After his freshman year at Gonzaga, he transferred to Brigham Young University (BYU), where he played baseball for the Cougars.

In 2016, as a junior at BYU, Rucker posted an 11–1 record, with a 2.73 ERA over  innings, earning a spot on the All-West Coast Conference First Team. After his junior year, Rucker was drafted by the Chicago Cubs in the 11th round of the 2016 Major League Baseball draft, and he signed with them for $180,000.

Professional career
After signing, Rucker made his professional debut with the Arizona League Cubs before finishing the season with the Eugene Emeralds; in  relief innings pitched between both teams, he did not give up an earned run and was 3–0. He began 2017 with the South Bend Cubs, and after seven relief appearances in which he compiled a 1.42 ERA, he was promoted to the Myrtle Beach Pelicans, where he transitioned into a starting pitcher. In 20 games (15 starts) for Myrtle Beach, he was 5–5 with a 2.51 ERA. He spent the 2018 season with the Tennessee Smokies, going 9–6 with a 3.73 ERA in 26 starts. He returned to Tennessee to begin 2019 and was promoted to the Iowa Cubs during the season. Over  innings (pitched mainly in relief), Rucker compiled a 0–3 record with a 4.18 ERA and 93 strikeouts.

On December 12, 2019, Rucker was selected by the Baltimore Orioles in the 2019 Rule 5 draft. On March 6, 2020, the Orioles returned Rucker to the Cubs. He did not play a minor league game in 2020 due to the cancellation of the minor league season caused by the COVID-19 pandemic. To begin the 2021 season, he was assigned to Iowa.

On July 30, 2021, Chicago selected his contract and promoted him to the active roster. He made his MLB debut that night against the Washington Nationals, throwing two innings of relief, giving up one run while recording one strikeout. With the Cubs in 2021, he pitched  innings in relief with a 6.99 ERA and thirty strikeouts.

See also
Rule 5 draft results

References

External links

1994 births
Living people
Arizona League Cubs players
Baseball players from Mississippi
BYU Cougars baseball players
Chicago Cubs players
Eugene Emeralds players
Gonzaga Bulldogs baseball players
Iowa Cubs players
Major League Baseball pitchers
Myrtle Beach Pelicans players
People from Columbus, Mississippi
South Bend Cubs players
Tennessee Smokies players